Felici is an Italian surname.  Notable people with the surname include:

Alessandro Felici (1742–1772), Italian composer and violinist
Angelo Felici (1919–2007), cardinal of the Roman Catholic Church
Antonio Felici (born 1968), Italian journalist and writer
Emanuela Felici (born 1980), Sammarinese sport shooter
Ettore Felici (1881–1951), second Apostolic Nuncio to Ireland
Mattia Felici (born 2001), Italian football player
Pericle Felici (1911–1982), cardinal of the Catholic Church
 (1695–1776), Italian composer

References

Italian-language surnames